Anatrophon is a genus of sea snails, marine gastropod mollusks in the family Muricidae, the murex snails or rock snails.

Species
Species within the genus Anatrophon include:

 Anatrophon sarmentosus (Hedley & May, 1908)

References

 
Monotypic gastropod genera